Daphoenura is a monotypic moth genus of the family Noctuidae. Its only species, Daphoenura fasciata, is found on Madagascar. Both the genus and species were first described by Arthur Gardiner Butler in 1878.

References

Cuculliinae
Monotypic moth genera